The Global Fund for Women is a non-profit foundation funding women's human rights initiatives. It was founded in 1987 by New Zealander Anne Firth Murray, and co-founded by Frances Kissling and Laura Lederer to fund women's initiatives around the world.  It is headquartered in San Francisco, California. Since 1988, the foundation has awarded over $100 million in grants to over 4,000 organizations supporting progressive women's rights in over 170 countries. Ms. Magazine has called the Global Fund for Women "one of the leading global feminist funds."

History 

The Global Fund for Women awarded the organization's first grants in 1988 to eight grantees totaling $31,000.

In September 1996, Murray retired and was succeeded by Kavita N. Ramdas.  Ramdas ended her 14-year tenure at the Global Fund in September 2010, and was succeeded by Musimbi Kanyoro in August 2011.

In September 2005, the Global Fund for Women created the Legacy Fund, which is the largest endowment in the world dedicated exclusively to women's rights.  It donates over $8.5 million annually to women-led organizations.

Latanya Mapp Frett, who previously served as executive director of Planned Parenthood Global, was appointed president and CEO of the Global Fund for Women in June 2019.

Profile 
The Global Fund for Women is an international grantmaking foundation that supports groups working to advance the human rights of women and girls.  They advocate for and defend women's human rights by making grants to support women's groups around the world.

Funds that support the Global Fund for Women are raised from a variety of sources and are awarded to women-led organizations that promote economic security, health, safety, education and leadership of women and girls.

The Global Fund for Women accepts grant proposals in any language and in any format.

Issues and initiatives 
 Access to Education
 Civic & Political Participation
 Economic & Environmental Justice
 Health & Sexual Rights
 Peace & Gender Violence
 Social Change Philanthropy
 Women Dismantling Militarism

Publications 

The Global Fund for Women publishes an annual report reporting their financial status, information on their grant partners, and recognition of their donors.  This report also contains reflections, statistics and projections about the status of women and girls around the world.

The Global Fund for Women also publishes "Impact Reports" which focus on specific issues impacting women and girls.

See also
 Feminism
 Kavita Ramdas
 Musimbi Kanyoro
 Reproductive rights
 Women's rights

References

External links
The Global Fund for Women Official website
2009 - 2010 Annual Report, Another World is On Her Way
Caught in the Storm: The Impact of Natural Disasters Impact Report
What Girls Need to Grow: Lessons for Social Change Philanthropy Impact Report
More Than Money: Strategies to Build Women's Economic Power Impact Report
Global Fund for Women Announces Largest Endowment Ever for Women Around the World  $20 Million Fund Addresses AIDS, Trafficking, Post-Disaster Recovery, Other Critical Threats; Investing in Women Key to Ending Violence, Promoting Democracy (Press Release 2005)
Global Fund for Women on YouTube Official Global Fund for Women YouTube Channel

Non-profit organizations based in San Francisco
Women's rights organizations
Organizations established in 1987
Women's organizations based in the United States